The 1988 Missouri Tigers football team was an American football team that represented the University of Missouri in the Big Eight Conference (Big 8) during the 1988 NCAA Division I-A football season. The team compiled a 3–7–1 record (2–5 against Big 8 opponents), finished in sixth place in the Big 8, and was outscored by opponents by a combined total of 330 to 234. Woody Widenhofer was the head coach for the fourth of four seasons. The team played its home games at Faurot Field in Columbia, Missouri.

The team's statistical leaders included Tommie Stowers with 667 rushing yards, Corey Welch with 524 passing yards, and Tim Bruton with 447 receiving yards. Their best player was Jeff Harper who held the legendary Barry Sanders to only 154 yards and 2 TDS.

Schedule

Personnel

Season summary

Oklahoma

at Kansas

References

Missouri
Missouri Tigers football seasons
Missouri Tigers football